The 1949 Chicago Cubs season was the 78th season of the Chicago Cubs franchise, the 74th in the National League and the 34th at Wrigley Field. The Cubs finished eighth and last in the National League with a record of 61–93.

Offseason 
 October 4, 1948: Bill Nicholson was traded by the Cubs to the Philadelphia Phillies for Harry Walker.
 November 8, 1948: Bob Speake was signed as an amateur free agent by the Cubs.

Regular season

Season standings

Record vs. opponents

Notable transactions 
 June 15, 1949: Peanuts Lowrey and Harry Walker were traded by the Cubs to the Cincinnati Reds for Frank Baumholtz and Hank Sauer.

Roster

Player stats

Batting

Starters by position 
Note: Pos = Position; G = Games played; AB = At bats; H = Hits; Avg. = Batting average; HR = Home runs; RBI = Runs batted in

Other batters 
Note: G = Games played; AB = At bats; H = Hits; Avg. = Batting average; HR = Home runs; RBI = Runs batted in

Pitching

Starting pitchers 
Note: G = Games pitched; IP = Innings pitched; W = Wins; L = Losses; ERA = Earned run average; SO = Strikeouts

Other pitchers 
Note: G = Games pitched; IP = Innings pitched; W = Wins; L = Losses; ERA = Earned run average; SO = Strikeouts

Relief pitchers 
Note: G = Games pitched; W = Wins; L = Losses; SV = Saves; ERA = Earned run average; SO = Strikeouts

Farm system 

LEAGUE CHAMPIONS: Nashville, Macon, Rutherford County

References

External links

1949 Chicago Cubs season at Baseball Reference

Chicago Cubs seasons
Chicago Cubs season
Chicago Cubs